Nylon Chen (Pha̍k-fa-sṳ: Chhîn Nái-yîn; born 20 May 1981) is a Taiwanese singer and actor.

Biography

Background
Nylon Chen was born on May 20, 1981 in Taipei, Taiwan.

Acting career
Before officially debuting, Chen first appeared in 2008's Honey and Clover series starring Joe Cheng and Janine Chang, playing the character of Lu Shan Qi. He began acting as a second male lead in 2011 for his character role in Happy Dandelion alongside Lene Lai. He, then, continued participating in various television dramas as part of the supporting cast or as a guest. He also tried dubbing the voice of Korean actor-singer Siwon of Super Junior in manga-turned-series Skip Beat in 2011.

He participated in two more television dramas as a second male lead, particularly in Spring Love and Deja Vu in 2012 and 2013 respectively. In 2014, he received his first role as a male lead, playing the character Huang Shi Jia. In preparation, Chen exercised more than before from weight training to running, as well as eating more meat and vegetables, and taking high-protein supplements for better fitness.

Music career
Besides his acting career, Nylon Chen is also a singer-songwriter and is good in playing the keyboards. He calls himself 'musical zhainan' (音樂宅男), because he mostly spends his time at home (zhainan means 'recluse'), writing and composing songs. He also loves performing live and be able to interact with other musicians.

"Writing a song is like falling in love. You have to safeguard that precious instinct or the politics of the music business will rob you of it." — Nylon Chen

His debut album entitled Paradise was released on July 15, 2009 under Believe In Music. The ten tracks in the album were chosen from over 300 songs written by himself. The album peaked at 4 at G-Music Charts on the first week of its release, and managed to reach the third spot on its second week.

In the span of three years since his album release, he spent most of his days writing songs. He managed to create over 100 songs for his upcoming album, mostly talks about "a musician dealing with personal struggles". On July 7, 2012, Chen released his second album Same Species (同種異類) under Rock Records, which landed at number 4 at G-Music Charts. Besides participating in its production, the eleven-track album was entirely written and composed by Chen, himself. He then held a concert entitled One Man Nakashi (一個人的那卡西) on October 13 at 4pm at Legacy Taipei concert to promote his album.

He also composes original soundtracks for television dramas, such as "Summon Beast" and "Spring" in K.O.3an Guo and Happy Dandelion series respectively, and advertisement songs, which includes "Jasmine Tea" (茉莉茶園) by Taiwanese girl-group S.H.E. In fact, just after the end of KO One Re-act series, Chen was asked to write a theme song within a day for 做自己的英雄 short film.

Filmography

Television series

Discography

Studio albums

Soundtrack contributions

Production credits

Concerts

Awards

References

External links
 Nylon Chen's blog

1981 births
Living people
21st-century Taiwanese  male singers
Taiwanese Mandopop singers
Taiwanese male television actors
Male actors from Taipei
Musicians from Taipei